Parit Sulong Bridge is a famous bridge in Parit Sulong, Batu Pahat District, Johor, Malaysia and the site of a battle during World War II.

History

Construction
The construction of the bridge began in 1925 and it was completed in 1929. The late Almarhum Sultan Ibrahim of Johor later officiated the opening of the bridge in 1930. The construction of the bridge with the curve shape at the middle for the purpose of convenient passage for bauxite ore barge from Seri Medan. 

Anecdotal accounts by local people also reported the late Almarhum Sultan Ibrahim of Johor has shaking one of the bridge structure with intention for examination of bridge firm.

The Battle of Parit Sulong Bridge

During World War II, the battle of Parit Sulong Bridge between the British and Imperial Japanese Army took place on January 21, 1942.

End of the old bridge

In 1993 the Johor state government decided to demolish the old bridge and replace it. The old bridge was finally torn down in 1994. The new bridge was constructed on 1995 and completed in 1997.

References
Adopted from Jambatan Parit Sulong - Buku Rekod Malaysia Edisi Kedua, Ghulam Jie M Khan

Batu Pahat District
Bridges in Johor
Bridges completed in 1929
Bridges completed in 1997